Defected Records is a British independent record label specialising in house music recordings, compilation albums, events, publishing, artist booking and management. One of the longest running independent labels of its kind, Defected has paved the way for house music in the UK and remained a well-respected constant in the music industry for over 20 years.

History 
Established in 1999 by former AM:PM and Cooltempo A&R man Simon Dunmore and initially funded by London nightclub and label Ministry of Sound, Defected's first release was Soulsearcher's "I Can't Get Enough", which reached No. 5 on the UK Singles Chart. This early success was followed up with Roger Sanchez's "Another Chance", which hit No. 1 on the UK Singles Chart in 2001.  Iconic club tracks such as Masters at Work's "To Be in Love" and Paul Johnson's "Get Get Down" dropped in Defected's first year, followed by Bob Sinclar's "I Feel for You" and Kings of Tomorrow's "Finally", with Julie McKnight.

In late 2016, Defected hit its 500th release, a catalogue that has included singles from artists such as Bob Sinclar, Kings of Tomorrow, Masters at Work, Inner City, Dennis Ferrer, Lenny Fontana, Roy Davis Jr., DJ Gregory, Mr G, Marc Kinchen (MK) and more recently Franky Rizardo, Purple Disco Machine, Amine Edge & Dance, Peggy Gou and many more.

Celebrating 20 years of the label and "everything there is to love about house music", Defected kicked off 2019 with a series of special events and announcements. On Friday, 4 January 2019, BBC Radio 1 broadcast the year's first Essential Mix, a special Influences Essential Mix by Simon Dunmore that provided, in Dunmore's own words, "an insight into the music I love and that continues to influence everything we aspire to achieve at Defected Records, as we celebrate 20 years in the house!".

Significant releases 
In 1999, Powerhouse (Lenny Fontana) featuring Duane Harden's "What You Need" debuted on Top of the Pops in the top 15 and went on to become a European radio hit in many countries worldwide.

In addition to the 2001 No. 1 one from Roger Sanchez, Defected has released a number of records that have had a significant impact on the house scene. Kings of Tomorrow's "Finally" was voted the 31st best track of 2000–2010 by electronic dance music portal Resident Advisor, and is still a regular feature of DJ sets to this day. Swiss duo Shakedown's "At Night"  reached No. 6 on the UK Singles Chart in 2002, and No. 1 on the UK Dance Chart.

The Defected in the House compilation launched in 2003 with Jay-J & Miguel Migs and has since featured artists such as Loco Dice, Gilles Peterson, the Shapeshifters, Louie Vega and Tensnake, as well as annual compilations dedicated to Ibiza and Miami, Croatia and other notable clubbing destinations.

Bob Sinclar's 2005 track "Love Generation" reached No. 12 in the UK and was a hit all over Europe and in Australia, achieving one of the longest runs of all time in the German singles charts and going on to sell over one million copies worldwide. The Irish duo Fish Go Deep also had success with their hit "Cure and the Cause" which stayed in the Beatport top 100 for almost a year.

During Defected's 10th year, the label found success with underground hits like Dennis Ferrer's "Hey Hey". In addition, they have released a number of underground hits from both seminal recordings artists and up and coming DJs and producers, including Inner City's "Future", Intruder feat. Jai's "Amame", Flashmob's "Need in Me", Pirupa's "Party Non Stop", Candi Staton's "Hallelujah Anyway", Noir & Haze's "Around", FCL's "It's You", Kings of Tomorrow feat. April's "Fall for You", Rachel Row's "Follow the Step" and Storm Queen's "Look Right Through", many of which have won awards or gone on to be some of the biggest club records of the year.

2010s

In 2017, Defected released CamelPhat & Elderbrook's "Cola", which earned worldwide success and was nominated for Best Dance Recording at the 2018 Grammy Awards and Ivor Novello Awards, and went platinum in the UK and multiple international territories, an unprecedented success for an independent house music label in the UK.

In 2019, Defected celebrated its 20th anniversary. During the year, Defected released Roberto Surace's "Joys", which became the Italian producer's first No. 1 on Billboard'''s Dance Club Songs chart and joint ventured Shazam Ibiza dance charts (in its 12 October and 30 September 2019 issues, respectively).

In September 2019, the label released Endor's "Pump It Up!", Brighton producer Dan Hardingham's debut track with Defected. This track would reach No. 1 on Billboard'''s Dance Club Songs chart and would also reach number 8 on the UK Singles Chart with 18 weeks spent within the Official Charts Company's Top 75. Nowadays, Defected is considered for many as the most notable house music label in the UK.

2020s

In 2020, Defected released a new Inner City single called "No More Looking Back", a record which featured actor Idris Elba, while in June 2021, the label released a remix by David Penn to the track "Hernando" by Lyuidmila Chicksulanaya and Yan4ick, which became a hit in many charts in Russia.

Rebrand
As Defected Records approached its 15-year anniversary, it underwent a rebranding led by designer, DJ and producer Trevor Jackson, working alongside Defected founder Simon Dunmore as well as other members of the Defected team.

Glitterbox
Glitterbox is a nightlife phenomenon, conceptualised in 2014 by Defected boss Simon Dunmore. Ever since, Glitterbox has made an inclusive, superior party atmosphere made to unite all ages and diversities on the dancefloor. A weekly radio show presented by Melvo Baptiste is available on YouTube, and syndicated on stations around the world.

Record label
The Glitterbox label has put out music by Aeroplane (featuring Tawatha Agee from Mtume), Purple Disco Machine, The Shapeshifters and Mousse T.

Events

Defected holds regular events in London at Studio 338, Ministry of Sound and Printworks. They also tour the US, Australia and Europe.

Ibiza
Defected held a residency at Pacha in Ibiza throughout the summer season (June – September) for 8 years. In 2013, Defected left Pacha and took up residency at the Cipriani-owned Booom!, at which was the most successful night over the summer season. Since 2017, Defected has moved to Eden in San Antonio, holding a 20+ week residency there, along with hosting Cafe Mambo on Sundays.

Croatia
In its third year, Defected Croatia took place during the second week of August, on the Adriatic Coast in Tisno, Croatia.

The festival draws a crowd of 3,000 from the UK, Australia, L.A., South Africa and all corners of Europe to experience the six-day event. DJs on the lineup have included Eats Everything, Sam Divine, MK, Kenny Dope, Franky Rizardo, Derrick Carter, Roger Sanchez, Claptone, Basement Jaxx and over 80 DJs.
The festival includes three stages onsite, boat parties and afterparties at the Barbarella's.

London
Defected marked its 20th anniversary in 2019 with its biggest event in the capital, Defected London Festival which took place at East London's Central Park. The festival hosted a crowd of 12,000 and had a line-up that included Masters at Work, Dennis Ferrer, Dimitri from Paris, Claptone, Sam Divine, Purple Disco Machine, The Shapeshifters, Miss Honey Dijon and more.

Founder of the label, Simon Dunmore talks of London's music scene, "The cultural and musical diversity in our city grows ever stronger and we are proud to bring people together through music. With it being our 20th anniversary this year, it just felt like the right moment to do our first London festival".

Sub-labels

 4 to the Floor Records
 Azuli
 Bargrooves
 Big Love Music
 Classic Music Company
 D4 D4nce
 DFTD
 DFX Records
 Dvine Sounds
 Faith
 Faya Combo
 Fluential Records
 4 To The Floor
 Fourth Floor Records
 Freeze Records
 Glitterbox Recordings
 ITH Records
 K4B Records
 Movin' Records
 Nu Groove
 Slip N' Slide
 Sondela Recordings
 Soul Heaven
 Soulfuric Recordings
 Soulfuric Deep
 Soulfuric Trax
 Sub-Urban
 Yoruba

References

External links
 Defected Records website

British independent record labels
English electronic dance music record labels
House music record labels
Record labels established in 1999
1999 establishments in the United Kingdom